The VTech Socrates is an 8-bit educational home video game console manufactured and released in 1988 by VTech. The console features a robot character Socrates, named after the philosopher. The character is visually similar to Johnny Five from the Short Circuit movies. It was discontinued in the early 1990s.

The system features standard wireless controllers that communicated via infrared reception.

Yeno distributed the system in Europe. In Germany, under the name Prof. Weiss-Alles, which translates to "Professor Knows-Everything". And in France, as the Professeur Saitout; Jeu Educatif Video, where "Saitout" comes from the french phrase "Sais Tout", meaning "Knows All".

VTech also distributed the system in Canada, being sold as the Socrates Saitout; Jeu Educatif Video.

Games 

The main unit of the Socrates system is bundled with games in five categories: Math Problems, Word Problems, Word Games, Music Games, and Super Painter. Math Problems and Word Problems test basic skills regarding mathematics, spelling, definition, and sentence construction. Word Games resemble hangman, anagrams, and a racing game where players spell words in order to complete laps around a track. Music Games gives students the opportunity to compose simple melodies, listen to classic folk songs played by the machine, or play Simon Says with different notes. Super Painter allows students to create on-screen art through the use of different brushes, colors, backgrounds, and clip art. The Super Painter program would be spun off by VTech for their Video Painter line of toys.

Additional unbundled games for the system are packaged as cartridges which resemble 3.5" floppy disks. Brain Teasers are labeled in blue text and test students' memory and problem-solving skills. Awareness Games are labeled in red text, and teach students trivia, mathematics, and geography. Additional peripherals for the system use their own cartridges. The CAD Professor uses the Mouse tablet, and focuses on architectural, textile, and fashion design. The Touch Pad allows younger students to practice writing letters and numbers and drawing shapes; however, students can also use the Touch Pad with the Super Painter application.

The system also features voice capabilities through the use of an add-on voice cartridge compatible with all games.

Despite the processing speed of the Zilog CPU – 3.57 MHz, compared to the Nintendo Entertainment System's 1.79 MHz in NTSC regions – the Socrates often seems slow, with the system often taking several seconds to display a static image. The system will "draw" images by filling in areas of the screen with color one line at a time; it is not known whether this is an effect employed for the student's enjoyment or if it is due to the slow processing time of the system. There is also a latency between user input and system responses. Response times do not seem to be affected by the presence or absence of the voice cartridge.

List of Socrates games

There are  titles known to have been released.

Hardware 

The standard system includes a wireless full keyboard with two wired-on controllers. The keyboard sends infrared signals to a receiver on the main console. Consoles vary in their effectiveness in receiving the signals; some can  receive signals from up to twelve feet away, while others require the user to maintain a close and direct line with the receiver. The Mouse and Touch Pad peripherals – for the CAD Professor and Touch Pad cartridges respectively – also use infrared signals to communicate with the main system, but similar signal receiving issues may hamper the usefulness of these add-ons.

Price and phase-out
The system was quite expensive upon its initial release; most consoles saw prices of up to $130. The cost put it at odds with other educational toys and even VTech's other products, including the Whiz Kid systems. The system was released as the third generation of video game consoles – including the Sega Master System and the Nintendo Entertainment System – were on the way out. Because of the Socrates' limited games library and slow speeds, it quickly became obsolete among growing expectations regarding speed, graphics, and engagement, even among educational titles.

The Socrates was phased out after a few years. Today, it is considered rare, although attempts to emulate the system proceed as part of the MESS project. A small amount of hobbyist interest in the Socrates has risen in the past decade, as past users have shared more information about it on the Internet.

References

External links
 VTech Socrates games playable for free in the browser at the Internet Archive Console Living Room
 20th Century Retro Games entry (Gallery page for various VTech Socrates models)

Third-generation video game consoles
Products introduced in 1988
VTech
Educational toys
Z80-based home computers